is a Japanese animator, television and film director. Working for Kyoto Animation, he directed The Melancholy of Haruhi Suzumiya, Clannad, Nichijou, Love, Chunibyo & Other Delusions and Sound! Euphonium.

Early life and education

Career
His first credit as an episode director was for the 1995 episode of Tenchi Universe titled "No Need for Worries!". In 2021, he replaced Yasuhiro Takemoto as the director for Miss Kobayashi's Dragon Maid S, following the latter's death during the Kyoto Animation arson attack.

Filmography

Television

As series director
Air (2005)
Kanon (2006)
Clannad (2007)
Clannad After Story (2008)
The Melancholy of Haruhi Suzumiya (2006, 2009)
Nichijou (2011)
Love, Chunibyo & Other Delusions (2012)
Love, Chunibyo & Other Delusions -Heart Throb- (2014)
Sound! Euphonium (2015)
Myriad Colors Phantom World (2016)
Sound! Euphonium 2 (2016)
Miss Kobayashi's Dragon Maid S (2021)

As episode director only
Tenchi Universe (1995)
Fushigi Yûgi (1995)
Baby & Me (1996)
Super Milk Chan (2000)
Inuyasha (2000–2002)
Full Metal Panic? Fumoffu (2003)
Lucky Star (2007)
K-On! (2009)
K-On!! (2010)
Tamako Market (2013)
Amagi Brilliant Park (2014)
Free! – Dive to the Future (2018)

Film
The Disappearance of Haruhi Suzumiya (as chief director, 2010)
Sound! Euphonium The Movie (2016)
Sound! Euphonium: Todoketai Melody (as chief director, 2017)
Love, Chunibyo & Other Delusions! Take on Me (2018)
Sound! Euphonium The Movie - Our Promise: A Brand New Day (2019)

Original video animation
Shiawasette Naani (1991)
Nichijou Episode 0 (2011)
Love, Chunibyo & Other Delusions: Depth of Field – Love and Hate Theater (2012–2013)
Sound! Euphonium: Ensemble Contest (2023)

Original net animation
Love, Chunibyo & Other Delusions! Lite (2012)
Love, Chunibyo & Other Delusions! Ren Lite (2013–2014)

References

External links

1966 births
Anime directors
Japanese film directors
Japanese television directors
Kyoto Animation people
Living people
People from Maizuru